Durand of the Bad Lands may refer to:

 A novel by Maibelle Heikes Justice 
 Durand of the Bad Lands (1917 film), a silent American film
 Durand of the Bad Lands (1925 film), a silent American film